Acanthocobitis (Paracanthocobitis) maekhlongensis also known as the Maekhlong zipper loach is a species of ray-finned fish in the genus, or subgenus, Paracanthocobitis. This species is known from the Maeklong River basin, Kanchanaburi Province, Thailand.

This fish is distinguished from others of its type due to its suborbital groove, pelvic fin, large dorsal fin, irregular light and dark spots, and thin dorsal saddles. It is found in a freshwater environment, demersal zone, and tropical range.

References

maekhlongensis
Fish described in 2015
Taxa named by Lawrence M. Page